The Bellman joke is a type of simple joke cycle popular among Swedish schoolchildren, always including a person named Bellman as the main character. 

The jokes first became popular in the 19th century, and were originally inspired by the life of the poet and composer Carl Michael Bellman. The first known Bellman joke appears in the preface to an 1835 collection of Bellman's works, in which the publisher reprints an 1808 letter from a contemporary of Bellman, containing the following anecdote.

19th-century Bellman jokes tended to focus on C. M. Bellman's life at court, and often contained sexual humour. Since then, however, the Bellman character of the jokes has changed into a generic Swede, rather than the historical figure. The shift from jokes told by adults to jokes told mainly by young schoolchildren up to 10 years of age probably happened in the first half of the 20th century.

The modern versions of the Bellman jokes often include Bellman and two other characters of different nationalities, with the former coming out victorious from a tricky situation. However, in many Bellman jokes, Bellman is portrayed as something of an anti-hero, who may cheat, lie or even smell very bad in order to get the last laugh. Another common theme is that Bellman fools or makes fun of a priest, policeman or other authority figure. He can thus be seen as a modern sort of a trickster. The jokes tend to involve bodily functions such as urinating or defecating.

The ubiquitous character of the stories and the fact that they have been told in various forms for so many years have made them subject to study by ethnologists such as Bengt af Klintberg and researchers in children's culture.

Examples of contemporary Bellman jokes

A Russian, a German and Bellman wanted to see who could swim the fastest across the Atlantic. First out was the German. He swam one kilometer and drowned. 
Next came the Russian. He swam 10 kilometers and then he drowned. 
Now it was Bellman's turn. He swam and swam until he almost reached the coast of America – then he got tired and swam back.

A Dane, a Norwegian and Bellman made a wager on who could remain inside a goat pen the longest. First out was the Dane, who came out after just 10 minutes yelling "Damn! The goat stinks!" After him the Norwegian went in, and after half an hour he came out yelling, "Damn! The goat stinks!" Finally Bellman went in. After two hours the goat came rushing out yelling "Damn! Bellman stinks!"

A Frenchman, a Finn and Bellman bragged about who had the tallest flagpole. "My flagpole is so tall that it reaches up to the clouds", the Frenchman said. "My flagpole is so tall that it reaches higher than the clouds!", the Finn said. "My flagpole is so tall that it pokes God in his butt!", Bellman said.

References

External links 
Bellman jokes 

Stock characters in jokes
Joke cycles
Swedish humour
Swedish folklore
Carl Michael Bellman
Eponyms